Claudio Apollonio (21 August 1921 – 16 December 2008) was an Italian ice hockey player. He competed in the men's tournament at the 1948 Winter Olympics.

References

External links
 

1921 births
2008 deaths
Olympic ice hockey players of Italy
Ice hockey players at the 1948 Winter Olympics
People from Cortina d'Ampezzo
SG Cortina players
Sportspeople from the Province of Belluno